Leinier Savón Pineda (born 21 March 1989) is a Cuban visually impaired sprinter and long jumper. He made his international debut in 2014 and earned two gold medals in the 2016 Summer Paralympics. He is the cousin of heavyweight boxer Félix Savón.

Early life
Savon Pineda was born visually impaired but was unable to be officially diagnosed until he was more than a year old. During the wait, his mother enrolled him in a sports area but was unable to enter the School of Sports Initiation due to his height. As well, after finishing high school he was unable to enlist due to his visual impairment.

Career
Savon Pineda joined the Cuban national team in 2012, with whom he won the men's 100m and 200m T12 at the 2015 IPC Athletics World Championships and the men's 100m and 200m T12 at the 2015 Parapan American Games. He also set a new Americas record during the Championships with a time of 22.14. Following the Championship, Savon Pineda qualified for the 2016 Summer Paralympics, where he won two more gold medals in the men's 100m T1 and 200m T12. The following year, Savon Pineda took home another gold medal in the Men's 100m T12 at the 2017 World Para Athletics Championships.

Personal life
Savon Pineda is the cousin of heavyweight boxer Félix Savón.

References

External links 
 Paralympic profile

Living people
1989 births
Sportspeople from Guantánamo
Cuban male sprinters
Cuban male long jumpers
Paralympic athletes of Cuba
Athletes (track and field) at the 2016 Summer Paralympics
Medalists at the 2016 Summer Paralympics
Paralympic gold medalists for Cuba
Paralympic medalists in athletics (track and field)
Medalists at the 2015 Parapan American Games
Medalists at the 2019 Parapan American Games
World Para Athletics Championships winners